The Guatemala City Railway Museum, officially Museo del Ferrocarril FEGUA, is located in the main railway station in Guatemala City, Guatemala.

The museum has a collection of steam and diesel locomotives, passenger carriages and other rolling stock and items connected with the railway. It also has information about the historic development of the railways in Guatemala.

Gallery

See also
 Rail transport in Guatemala

External links

 www.museofegua.com - official website of the museum

Museums in Guatemala
Rail transport in Guatemala
Railway museums in Guatemala